The 2011 season of 1. deild karla was the 57th season of second-tier football in Iceland.

Stadia and locations

League table

Results
Each team play every opponent once home and away for a total of 22 matches.

Statistics

Top goalscorers
The top scorers from the 2011 1. deild karla are as follows:

19 goals
 Sveinbjörn Jónasson (Þróttur R.)

16 goals
 Viðar Örn Kjartansson (Selfoss)

15 goals
 Hjörtur Hjartarson (ÍA)

11 goals
 Tomi Ameobi (BÍ/Bolungarvík)

10 goals
 Eyþór Helgi Birgisson (HK)

9 goals
 Gary Martin (ÍA) 
 Daniel Howell (KA)
 Mark Doninger (ÍA)
 Pape Mamadou Faye (Leiknir R.)

Last updated: September 17, 2011

References

1. deild karla (football) seasons
Iceland
Iceland
2